Alvin C. Bush (January 22, 1924  February 8, 2017) was a Republican member of the Pennsylvania House of Representatives.

References

Republican Party members of the Pennsylvania House of Representatives
2017 deaths
1924 births
People from Philipsburg, Centre County, Pennsylvania